Włodzimierz Różański (7 June 1938 – 14 April 2006) was a Polish field hockey player. He competed in the men's tournament at the 1960 Summer Olympics.

References

External links
 

1938 births
2006 deaths
Polish male field hockey players
Olympic field hockey players of Poland
Field hockey players at the 1960 Summer Olympics
Sportspeople from Poznań
People from Poznań Voivodeship (1921–1939)